The Baiying Bologai Formation, in other literature named Bayan Bologai Formation, is an Early Cretaceous geologic formation in the Ömnögovi Province of Mongolia. Dinosaur remains are among the fossils that have been recovered from the formation, although none have yet been referred to a specific genus.

Fossil content 
The following fossils have been reported from the formation:
 Ankylosauridae indet.
 Hadrosauridae indet.

See also 
 List of dinosaur-bearing rock formations
 List of stratigraphic units with indeterminate dinosaur fossils
 Alagteeg Formation

References

Bibliography 

  
 
 

Geologic formations of Mongolia
Lower Cretaceous Series of Asia
Cretaceous Mongolia
Conglomerate formations
Paleontology in Mongolia
Formations